Seasons is the 11th country studio album by the American country music group The Oak Ridge Boys, released via MCA Records in 1986. The album features the singles "Juliet" and "You Made a Rock of a Rolling Stone", which both charted on Hot Country Songs.

Track listing

Personnel

The Oak Ridge Boys
Duane Allen - lead vocals
Joe Bonsall - tenor vocals
William Lee Golden - baritone vocals
Richard Sterban - bass vocals

Additional musicians
Acoustic Guitar: Billy Sanford
Bass guitar: David Hood, Jack Williams
Drums: Roger Hawkins, James Stroud
Electric Guitar: Jimmy Johnson, Brent Rowan, Billy Sanford
Fiddle: Mark O'Connor
Harmonica: Terry McMillan
Keyboards: Steve Nathan
Mandolin: Billy Sanford
Piano: David Briggs, Ron Oates
Saxophone: Jim Horn, Denis Solee, Harvey Thompson
Saxophone Solos: Jim Horn
Strings: The Nashville String Machine
String Arranger: Bergen White
Synthesizer: Steve Nathan
Trombone: Dennis Goode, Charles Rose
Trumpet: Harrison Calloway Jr., George Tidwell

Chart performance

References

1986 albums
MCA Records albums
The Oak Ridge Boys albums
Albums produced by Ron Chancey